Elizabeth McNamara (born 19 April 2002) is an Australian rules footballer playing for the Melbourne Football Club in the AFL Women's (AFLW). She received a nomination for the 2021 AFL Women's Rising Star award in round 7 of the 2021 season.

Early life

McNamara initially grew up playing basketball before picking up football at the age of twelve, playing for the Ashburton United Junior Football Club and the East Malvern Football Club. She grew up idolising  captain Daisy Pearce and  premiership player Bonnie Toogood, as well as Australian Olympic gold medallist Cathy Freeman.

McNamara played under-18s football for the Sandringham Dragons in the NAB League Girls, averaging 17 disposals and six tackles in three matches before the season was shut down due to the COVID-19 pandemic. Originally an inside midfielder, she made the switch to become an outside midfielder after suffering a serious concussion playing for Sandringham in 2019. When the Victorian draft combine was cancelled due to COVID-19 restrictions and players were forced to run their own two-kilometre time trials, McNamara recorded an unofficial time of 6:59, which would have beaten the record set by  midfielder Nina Morrison (7:14) if run under combine conditions.

AFL Women's career

On her first day of pre-season, she won the club's two-kilometre time trial ahead of regular winner Karen Paxman, again running in under seven minutes. Melbourne captain Daisy Pearce described McNamara as "one of the toughest people I've ever played with" in the lead-up to her first game. McNamara suffered a concussion after colliding with Adelaide captain Chelsea Randall in the first quarter of Melbourne's preliminary final loss to Adelaide, which would have ruled her out of playing in the grand final the following week had Melbourne progressed.

On the opening day of the 2022 pre-season, McNamara again finished first in Melbourne's two-kilometre time trial. She was forced to miss Melbourne's round 1 match against the  due to the AFL's health and safety protocols, playing her first match of the year the following week against . She was named Melbourne's best player in its loss to Adelaide in round 4, leading Melbourne for disposals with a career-high 22, and was among Melbourne's best players in its win over Brisbane in round 7. McNarama was one of four Melbourne players named in the initial 40-woman squad for that season's AFL Women's 22under22 team. She kicked a goal and was among Melbourne's best players in its preliminary final win over Brisbane, as Melbourne progressed to the 2022 AFL Women's Grand Final, its first grand final appearance.

In July, McNamara was ruled out of season seven after fracturing the lumbar region of her spine in a training accident, which would require a "serious, year-long (rehabilitation)", and caused her to miss Melbourne's season seven premiership win.

Statistics
Updated to the end of S7 (2022).

|-
| 2021 ||  || 22
| 11 || 2 || 2 || 90 || 28 || 118 || 16 || 30 || 0.2 || 0.2 || 8.2 || 2.5 || 10.7 || 1.5 || 2.7 || 0
|-
| 2022 ||  || 22
| 11 || 2 || 1 || 102 || 55 || 157 || 32 || 39 || 0.2 || 0.1 || 9.3 || 5.0 || 14.3 || 2.9 || 3.5 || 0
|-
| S7 (2022) ||  || 22
| 0 || — || — || — || — || — || — || — || — || — || — || — || — || — || — || 0
|- class=sortbottom
! colspan=3 | Career
! 22 !! 4 !! 3 !! 192 !! 83 !! 275 !! 48 !! 69 !! 0.2 !! 0.1 !! 8.7 !! 3.8 !! 12.5 !! 2.2 !! 3.1 !! 0
|}

Honours and achievements
 AFL Women's Rising Star nominee: 2021

References

External links

 
 
 

Living people
2002 births
Melbourne Football Club (AFLW) players
Australian rules footballers from Victoria (Australia)
Sandringham Dragons players